The 2015–16 San Jose State Spartans women's basketball team represented San José State University during the 2015–16 NCAA Division I women's basketball season. The Spartans, led by third year head coach Jamie Craighead, played their home games at the Event Center Arena as members of the Mountain West Conference. They finished the season 13–17, 11–7 in Mountain West play to finish in fourth place. They lost in the quarterfinals of the Mountain West women's tournament to New Mexico.

Roster

Note: Junior guard Aniya Baker left the team in December for personal reasons.

Schedule

|-
!colspan=9 style="background:#005a8b; color:#c79900;"| Exhibition

|-
!colspan=9 style="background:#005a8b; color:#c79900;"| Non-conference regular season

|-
!colspan=9 style="background:#005a8b; color:#c79900;"| Mountain West regular season

|-
!colspan=9 style="background:#005a8b; color:#c79900;"| Mountain West Women's Tournament

See also
2015–16 San Jose State Spartans men's basketball team

References

San Jose State
San Jose State Spartans women's basketball seasons